Scacchi may refer to:
Greta Scacchi, an Italian-Australian actress
Arcangelo Scacchi (1810–1893), Italian mineralogist, discoverer of Dimorphite
The Italian word for Chess